Drupina grossularia, common name : the finger drupe, is a species of sea snail, a marine gastropod mollusk in the family Muricidae, the murex snails or rock snails.

Description
The shells of this species are yellow-mouthed and develop marginal lobate digitate processes. On the outer lip the teeth are singularly arranged. The radula has small and slender lateral teeth and a greatly modified rachidian radular tooth.

Distribution and habitat
This species is distributed in the Eastern Indian Ocean along Madagascar in the Philippines and in Eastern Polynesia. It prefers hard reef in the surf zone and reef areas of lagoons.

References

Gastropods described in 1798
Drupina